The 1960 Bolton East by-election was a by-election held for the British House of Commons constituency of Bolton East in Lancashire on 16 November 1960. It was won by the Conservative Party candidate Edwin Taylor.

Vacancy 

The seat became vacant when the sitting Conservative Member of Parliament Philip Bell, QC, was appointed as a County Court Judge. He had held the seat since the 1951 general election.

The by-election saw the decision of the Liberal Party to field a candidate, which broke a local pact which had held for 10 years whereby the Liberals left the Bolton East seat alone, and in return the Conservatives did not stand in Bolton West; the pact had achieved its objective of preventing the Labour Party from winning either.

Result 

Taylor was elected by a margin of 641 votes over Labour candidate Robert Howarth, with the Liberal candidate Frank Byers securing a quarter of the vote. Dissension within the Labour Party over nuclear disarmament was thought to have helped Taylor win.

At the 1964 general election, a more organised Labour campaign in Bolton East saw Taylor voted out by a margin of more than 3,000 votes. A Conservative stood in Bolton West for the first time since 1950, resulting in a Labour gain from the Liberal Arthur Holt by roughly the same margin.

Votes

References 

 British Parliamentary by-elections: Bolton East 1960
 1959 general election results at Richard Kimber's political science resources

By-elections to the Parliament of the United Kingdom in Greater Manchester constituencies
1960 elections in the United Kingdom
1960 in England
1960s in Lancashire
Elections in the Metropolitan Borough of Bolton
By-elections to the Parliament of the United Kingdom in Lancashire constituencies